Bear Creek Township, Arkansas may refer to:

 Bear Creek Township, Boone County, Arkansas (former township)
 Bear Creek Township, Sevier County, Arkansas
 Bear Creek No. 4 Township, Searcy County, Arkansas
 Bear Creek No. 5 Township, Searcy County, Arkansas
 Bear Creek No. 6 Township, Searcy County, Arkansas

See also 
 List of townships in Arkansas
 Bear Creek Township (disambiguation)

Arkansas township disambiguation pages